A chardak (Bulgarian, Macedonian and , čardak)  is an old typical house in the Balkans. It is derived from the word cardak, which is a component of Ottoman Turkish house design. This term, which is also called sofa, denotes an open hall of a house's upper living floor.

Description 
The chardak is timber-framed and usually include a hayat. The design has been described as "Greek-Oriental," Southern European," and "Mediterranean".  It has a fortified  ground floor and a wooden upper floor. This dwelling was used as a protective small fort.

Chardak can also refer to the space – a part of the central hall area – that connects the rooms of the house.

Chardaks were also used as fortifications in the early modern period.

References 

 Милан Крухек: Крајишке утврде хрватског краљевства тијеком 16. стољећа, Институт за сувремену повијест - Библиотека хрватска повјесница. Загреб, 1995.

Vernacular architecture
Balkans